Wesley Gay Stock (born April 10, 1934 in Longview, Washington) is a former Major League Baseball pitcher, pitching coach and television commentator. He appeared in 321 games pitched (all but three in relief) between 1959 and 1967 with the Baltimore Orioles and Kansas City Athletics.

Stock attended Shelton High School then Washington State University (then College) where he was initiated into Phi Kappa Tau fraternity.  He played college baseball for the Cougars from 1954 to 1955. He signed with the Orioles in 1956, and spent 1957–1958 performing military service. His initial trial with Baltimore, in April 1959, came after only one season of minor league baseball, in the Class C Northern League.

Over all or parts of nine MLB seasons, Stock won 27 of 40 decisions (a winning percentage of .675), with 365 strikeouts and 22 saves in  innings pitched. He allowed 434 hits and 215 bases on balls.

Although a weak hitter in his major league career, posting only a .051 batting average (3-for-59), he was better than average defensively. He recorded a .980 fielding percentage with only three errors in 148 total chances, which was 25 points higher than the league average during his career.

After his final appearance on the mound, Stock became a pitching coach for the Athletics in both Kansas City (from July 13, 1967, through the end of that season) and Oakland (1973–1976; 1984–1986), Milwaukee Brewers (1970–1972), and Seattle Mariners (1977–1981). He was a coach on the  American League All-Star team and on the 1973–1974 World Series champion A's. In his two years as the minor league pitching coordinator for the New York Mets (1968–1969), working under his former teammate, Whitey Herzog, he helped develop mound talent that would contribute to the Mets' 1969 world championship.  In addition to coaching, Stock was one of the Mariners' television broadcasters in 1982 and 1983.

References

External links

Wes Stock at SABR (Baseball BioProject)

1934 births
Living people
Aberdeen Pheasants players
Baltimore Orioles players
Baseball players from Washington (state)
Kansas City Athletics coaches
Kansas City Athletics players
Major League Baseball pitchers
Major League Baseball pitching coaches
Milwaukee Brewers coaches
Miami Marlins (IL) players
Oakland Athletics coaches
People from Longview, Washington
People from Mason County, Washington
Seattle Mariners announcers
Seattle Mariners coaches
Vancouver Mounties players
Washington State Cougars baseball players